The Côte d'Or is a limestone escarpment in Burgundy, France of the same name of the department which was formed around it. It stretches from Dijon in the north to the river Dheune to the south, overlooking the valley of the Saône to the east.

The east-facing slope of the Côte d'Or is home to some of the greatest names of Burgundy wine, such as Gevrey-Chambertin, Clos de Vougeot, Meursault and Montrachet. The northern half, the Côte de Nuits, produces red wine almost exclusively. The Côte de Beaune, around Beaune in the south, produces a mix of white wine and red wine. The Route des Grands Crus (Route Nationale 74) runs along the foot of the ridge and is popular with tourists.
Scientists have not yet conclusively determined what factors cause the few small parcels of land on the Côte d'Or to produce superlative wines.

History
The area was settled by the Celts, and there is considerable evidence of Roman occupation in the area.  Later it came under the influence of the Dukes of Burgundy, with the Cistercians from Cîteaux Abbey playing a prominent role in the development of the vineyards.

Geology
If the Paris hydrological and geological basin is viewed as a saucer with Paris at its centre, the Côte d'Or may be seen as a segment of its south-eastern rim; the counterpart of the chalk cliffs of the Pays de Caux, on the English Channel coast to the north-west. The River Seine rises near the Côte d'Or and enters the sea near the Pays de Caux, having passed through Paris.

The Côte d'Or scarp arises where a broad, relatively shallow graben has formed as a result of an interaction between the forces raising the alpine ridges and the Massif Central. The Jurassic limestone contributes the chemically basic component of the mixture of requirements for a good vineyard, while the scarp provides the drainage and aspect.

At the Côte d'Or, the middle and upper Jurassic rocks overlook the Oligocene, Pliocene and Quaternary rocks of the plain through which the Saône flows southward towards the Mediterranean Sea. The côte therefore forms part of the watershed between northern and southern Europe. On the far side of the plain rise the Jura Mountains, for which the Jurassic period was named.

Comblanchien stone
Near Nuits-Saint-Georges, part of the middle Jurassic limestone has been metamorphosed into marble. The metamorphism seems to have arisen from the volcanic disturbances in the already existing (Variscan) Massif Central, set off by the Alpine orogeny. The Massif Central is represented locally by its northern extension, the Morvan, which lies between Nevers and the Côte d'Or.

There is a famous vein of fine-grained marble called Pierre de Comblanchien extending from the village of Comblanchien, just south of Nuits-Saint-Georges. The quarries lie in the Côte north and south of the village, overlooking Route Nationale 74.  The stone comes in a variety of shades, from beige to the pink of bindweed (Convolvulus). It is not susceptible to frost damage  and is capable of accepting a polish.

See also
Burgundy wine
French wine

References

Further reading
  A bit out of date, and doesn't cover all of Burgundy, but is still the definitive guide. An updated version covering the whole region is due in early 2008.
  Also in the process of being replaced, in two volumes - the book covering the outlying regions is due in late 2007, the Côte d'Or presumably in late 2008.
  Foreword by Michael Broadbent, again a little out of date but good coverage of the top domaines.
  Good inexpensive introduction to the region, and up to date.
  An inexpensive introduction to the Côte d'Or and the most up to date.

External links
 thewinedoctor.com  A great overview of the geography and wines of Burgundy.
 The Burgundy Report Good descriptions of the vineyards and vintages.

Burgundy wine
Landforms of Côte-d'Or
Wine regions of France
Escarpments of Europe